Wolofal is a derivation of the Arabic script for writing the Wolof language. It is basically the name of a West African Ajami script as used for that language.

Wolofal was the first script for writing Wolof. Although the Latin alphabet is the official script of the language in today's Senegal, Wolofal is still used by many people as a symbol of Islamic Wolof culture.

In the traditional, non-standardized orthography, a three-dot diacritic is added to د to represent /nd/; to ج to represent /c, ɲ, ɲɟ/; to ك to represent /ŋ, g, ŋg/; and to ب to represent /p, mb/.

The short vowel marks of Arabic are written systematically, but /a,ə/, /i,e,ɛ/ and /u,o,ɔ/ are not distinguished from one another.

Bibliography 

 Mamadou Cissé: « Graphical borrowing and African realities » in Revue du Musée National d'Ethnologie d'Osaka, Japan, June 2000.
 Mamadou Cissé: « Écrits et écritures en Afrique de l'Ouest » in Sud Langues  June 2006.
 PanAfriL10n Wolof

Languages of the Gambia
Arabic alphabets
Writing systems of Africa
Wolof language